The City of Vancouver Book Award is a Canadian literary award, that has been presented annually by the city of Vancouver, British Columbia to one or more works of literature judged as the year's best fiction, non-fiction, poetry or drama work about the city.

As with the City of Toronto Book Award, the award may go to one or more books.

The award has a monetary value of $3,000. The prize is funded by interest earned from the city's publishing reserve, which was established in 1977 as a permanent legacy for writers and publishers. The fund received royalties generated from Vancouver's First Century: A Photo History of Vancouver, edited by city staff. The third edition of the book, renamed Vancouver: A City Album, for many years generated royalty payments for the fund.

Winners and finalists

References

External links 
City of Vancouver Book Award

Culture of Vancouver
British Columbia awards
1989 establishments in British Columbia
Awards established in 1989
Canadian fiction awards
Canadian non-fiction literary awards
Canadian poetry awards
Canadian dramatist and playwright awards